Thunduwa East Grama Niladhari Division is a Grama Niladhari Division of the Bentota Divisional Secretariat of Galle District of Southern Province, Sri Lanka. It has Grama Niladhari Division Code 12B.

Thunduwa East is a surrounded by the Meegama, Haburugala, Thunduwa West and Ladduwa Grama Niladhari Divisions.

Demographics

Ethnicity 
The Thunduwa East Grama Niladhari Division has a Moor majority (94.8%). In comparison, the Bentota Divisional Secretariat (which contains the Thunduwa East Grama Niladhari Division) has a Sinhalese majority (97.3%)

Religion 
The Thunduwa East Grama Niladhari Division has a Muslim majority (96.3%). In comparison, the Bentota Divisional Secretariat (which contains the Thunduwa East Grama Niladhari Division) has a Buddhist majority (97.1%)

References 

Grama Niladhari Divisions of Bentota Divisional Secretariat